West Carson is an unincorporated community in Los Angeles County, California. The population was 21,699 at the 2010 census, up from 21,138 at the 2000 census. For statistical purposes, the United States Census Bureau has defined West Carson as a census-designated place (CDP).

Geography
The area is bounded on the east by the city of Carson along the Harbor Freeway (Interstate 110). The area is bounded on the other three sides by the city of Los Angeles. Del Amo Boulevard is the north boundary with the neighborhood of Harbor Gateway. Lomita Boulevard is the south boundary with the neighborhood of Harbor City. The west boundary along Normandie Avenue is shared by both Los Angeles neighborhoods.

The ZIP Code encompassing most of the area is 90502 which the United States Postal Service designates as a  Torrance mailing address after the city that lies to the west over the Los Angeles strip. The southern portion shares the 90710 ZIP Code with the Harbor City neighborhood.

Demographics

2010
At the 2010 census West Carson had a population of 21,699. The racial makeup of West Carson was 7,630 (35.2%) White (21.4% Non-Hispanic White), 2,330 (10.7%) African American, 185 (0.9%) Native American, 6,730 (31.0%) Asian, 301 (1.4%) Pacific Islander, 3,411 (15.7%) from other races, and 1,112 (5.1%) from two or more races. Hispanic or Latino of any race were 7,100 persons (32.7%).

The census reported that 20,493 people (94.4% of the population) lived in households, 176 (0.8%) lived in non-institutionalized group quarters, and 1,030 (4.7%) were institutionalized.

There were 7,166 households, 2,236 (31.2%) had children under the age of 18 living in them, 3,634 (50.7%) were opposite-sex married couples living together, 978 (13.6%) had a female householder with no husband present, 450 (6.3%) had a male householder with no wife present.  There were 311 (4.3%) unmarried opposite-sex partnerships, and 46 (0.6%) same-sex married couples or partnerships. 1,687 households (23.5%) were one person and 712 (9.9%) had someone living alone who was 65 or older. The average household size was 2.86.  There were 5,062 families (70.6% of households); the average family size was 3.40.

The age distribution was 4,066 people (18.7%) under the age of 18, 1,816 people (8.4%) aged 18 to 24, 5,805 people (26.8%) aged 25 to 44, 6,109 people (28.2%) aged 45 to 64, and 3,903 people (18.0%) who were 65 or older.  The median age was 42.1 years. For every 100 females, there were 94.9 males.  For every 100 females age 18 and over, there were 91.8 males.

There were 7,426 housing units at an average density of 3,258.7 per square mile, of the occupied units 5,459 (76.2%) were owner-occupied and 1,707 (23.8%) were rented. The homeowner vacancy rate was 1.6%; the rental vacancy rate was 4.3%.  15,074 people (69.5% of the population) lived in owner-occupied housing units and 5,419 people (25.0%) lived in rental housing units.

According to the 2010 United States Census, West Carson had a median household income of $62,100, with 8.6% of the population living below the federal poverty line.

2000
At the 2000 census there were 21,138 people, 7,156 households, and 5,052 families in the CDP. The population density was 9,355.3 inhabitants per square mile (3,611.3/km). The racial makeup of the CDP was 41.99% White, 11.75% African American, 0.66% Native American, 25.07% Asian, 1.20% Pacific Islander, 13.94% from other races, and 5.39% from two or more races. Hispanic or Latino of any race were 29.44%.

Of the 7,156 households 29.6% had children under the age of 18 living with them, 52.6% were married couples living together, 12.5% had a female householder with no husband present, and 29.4% were non-families. 24.0% of households were one person and 9.1% were one person aged 65 or older.  The average household size was 2.85 and the average family size was 3.41.

The age distribution was 22.6% under the age of 18, 8.0% from 18 to 24, 29.3% from 25 to 44, 24.8% from 45 to 64, and 15.3% 65 or older.  The median age was 38 years. For every 100 females, there were 92.5 males.  For every 100 females age 18 and over, there were 89.5 males.

The median household income was $49,118 and the median family income  was $55,000. Males had a median income of $41,085 versus $32,032 for females. The per capita income for the CDP was $21,023.  About 7.4% of families and 9.5% of the population were below the poverty line, including 12.4% of those under age 18 and 7.1% of those age 65 or over.

Education
Residents are zoned to the Los Angeles Unified School District. Meyler Street Elementary School and Van Deene Elementary School are in West Carson. Some of the students attend Torrance Unified School District even though it is 
located in the Los Angeles Unified School District.

Government and infrastructure
The Harbor–UCLA Medical Center, operated by the Los Angeles County Department of Health Services, has a Torrance postal address, but it is located in West Carson.

Politics
In the state legislature West Carson is located in the 28th Senate District, represented by Democrat Isadore Hall, III, and in the 55th Assembly District, represented by Democrat Al Muratsuchi. Federally, West Carson is located in California's 43rd and is represented by Democrat Maxine Waters.

See also

References

Census-designated places in Los Angeles County, California
Los Angeles Harbor Region
Census-designated places in California
South Bay, Los Angeles